Mary Downing Hahn (born December 9, 1937) is an American writer of young adult novels and a former school librarian. She is known for books such as Stepping On The Cracks and Wait Till Helen Comes. She published her first book in 1979 and has since written over 30 novels. Her novel What We Saw was published in September 2022.

Books

The Sara Summer (1979)
Time of the Witch (1982)
Daphne's Book (1983)
The Jellyfish Season (1985)
Wait Till Helen Comes (1986)
Following the Mystery Man (1988)
Tallahassee Higgins (1988)
December Stillness (1988)
The Doll in the Garden (1989)
The Dead Man in Indian Creek (1990)
The Spanish Kidnapping Disaster (1991)
Stepping on the Cracks (1991)
The Wind Blows Backward (1993)
Don't Give Up the Ghost (1993, contributor)
Time for Andrew (1994)
Look for Me by Moonlight (1995)
The Gentleman Outlaw and Me–Eli (1996)
Following My Own Footsteps (1996)
As Ever, Gordy (1998)
Anna All Year Round (1999)

Promises to the Dead (2000)
Anna on the Farm (2001)
Hear the Wind Blow (2003)
The Old Willis Place (2004)
Janey and the Famous Author (2005)
Witch Catcher (2006)
Deep and Dark and Dangerous (2007)
All the Lovely Bad Ones (2008)
Closed for the Season (2009)
The Ghost of Crutchfield Hall (2010)
Mister Death's Blue-Eyed Girls (2012)
Where I Belong (2014)
Took (2015)
 One for Sorrow (2017)
The Girl In The Locked Room (2018)
Guest: A Changeling Tale (2019)
The Puppet's Payback: And Other Chilling Tales (2020)
The Thirteenth Cat (2021)
What We Saw (2022)

Awards
Scott O'Dell Award for Historical Fiction for Stepping on the Cracks (1992)
Mystery Writers of America Edgar Award for Closed for the Season (2010)

State awards

Wait Till Helen Comes (1986)
Pacific Northwest Young Reader's Choice Award (Idaho, Montana, Oregon, and Washington)
Rebecca Caudhill Young Readers' Book Award (Illinois)
Young Hoosier Award (Indiana) 
Iowa Children's Choice Award
Maud Hart Lovelace Award (Minnesota)
Golden Sower Award (Nebraska)
Volunteer State Book Award  (Tennessee)
Texas Bluebonnet Award 
Utah Children's Book Award 
Dorothy Canfield Fisher Children's Book Award (Vermont)
Virginia Readers' Choice Award

The Doll in the Garden (1989)
Georgia Children's Book Award
Mark Twain Award (Missouri)
Virginia Readers' Choice Award 

The Dead Man In Indian Creek (1990)
Colorado Children's Book Award 
Maud Hart Lovelace Award (Minnesota)
South Carolina Children's Book Award
Utah Children's Book Award
Virginia Readers' Choice Award

Stepping on the Cracks (1991)
Golden Sower Award (Nebraska)
South Carolina Children's Book Award 

Time for Andrew (1994) 
California Young Reader's Medal 
Georgia Children's Book Award
Rebecca Caudhill Young Readers' Book Award (Illinois)
William Allen White Children's Book Award (Kansas)
Maryland Black-Eyed Susan Award 
Mark Twain Award (Missouri) 
Texas Bluebonnet Award
Utah Children's Book Award
Dorothy Canfield Fisher Children's Book Award (Vermont)
Virginia Readers' Choice Award

The Gentleman Outlaw and Me—Eli (1996)
Iowa Children's Choice Award

The Old Willis Place (2004)
William Allen White Children's Book Award (Kansas)
Golden Sower Award (Nebraska)
South Carolina Children's Book Award 
Volunteer State Book Award (Tennessee)
Dorothy Canfield Fisher Children's Book Award (Vermont) 

Witch Catcher (2006)
West Virginia Children's Book Award

Deep and Dark and Dangerous (2007)
Golden Sower Award (Nebraska)  

Closed for the Season (2009)
Golden Sower Award (Nebraska)

References

External links

 
 
 Mary Downing Hahn at Goodreads – with biographical statement by Hahn 

 

1937 births
American writers of young adult literature
Ghost story writers
Edgar Award winners
Living people
American women novelists
Women writers of young adult literature
20th-century American novelists
20th-century American women writers
21st-century American novelists
21st-century American women writers
American librarians
American women librarians
People from College Park, Maryland
Novelists from Maryland